Petar Šain (1885–1965) was a Bosnian artist. He was one of the first generation of art school-trained painters which included Gabrijel Jurkić, Petar Tiješić, Karlo Mijić, Špiro Bocarić, Đoko Mazalić, Roman Petrović and Lazar Drljača.

Works
 The Tinsmith

References

1885 births
1965 deaths
Bosnia and Herzegovina painters
20th-century Bosnia and Herzegovina painters